But for the Grace of God or There But for the Grace of God may refer to:

But for the Grace of God (play), by Frederick Lonsdale, 1946–47
"But for the Grace of God" (song), co-written and recorded by Keith Urban, 2000
"There But for the Grace of God", an episode of Stargate SG-1 (season 1)
"There But for the Grace of God", a 1979 song by American funk group Machine
"There But for the Grace of God", a 1994 song by English duo Fire Island
"There but for the grace of God go I", an idiomatic phrase traditionally attributed to John Bradford

See also
By the Grace of God (disambiguation)